Sydney Living Museums is the trading name of the Historic Houses Trust of New South Wales (HHT), a statutory corporation entrusted with the care and maintenance of historic sites throughout New South Wales, Australia, including various gardens, parklands and urban spaces. In 2011 its sites attracted over two million visitors each year.

The chief executive of the Trust, called Executive Director, is responsible to the Office of Environment and Heritage in the Department of Planning and Environment cluster. The Trust reports to the Minister for Heritage, who also serves as the Minister for the Environment. Ultimately the minister is responsible to the Parliament of New South Wales.

History
The Historic Houses Trust was established under the Historic Houses Trust Act 1980 and originally charged with the running of Elizabeth Bay House and Vaucluse House. Since then, the Trust has expanded to care for 12  houses, gardens and museums in New South Wales. The Trust also looks after over 48,000 catalogued objects across all of the sites. In 2013 the Historic Houses Trust launched its new identity as Sydney Living Museums to refresh and unify its diverse range of properties and highlight its role and relevance for current and future generations.

Sites
Sydney Living Museums manages the following sites:

References

External links
 
 

1980 establishments in Australia
Government agencies established in 1980
Museums in New South Wales
Culture of Sydney
Government agencies of New South Wales
History of Sydney